Paul "Digger" Diggin (born 23 January 1985 in Northampton, UK) is a professional rugby player in England for Northampton Saints and England Saxons.  He is also a former England under 16, 18, 19 and 21s player. He attended Northampton School for Boys where he captained the 1st XV.

Diggin is a versatile player, able to perform at fly-half, wing or fullback.

He signed a two-year contract extension which kept him at Northampton Saints until 2011. In 2012 he signed a contract for an undisclosed ending date.

Diggin was 1st team coach at Milton Keynes rugby club for the 2009/10 season. After a year there he returned to his boyhood club Northampton BBOB to become club coach.

Diggin is a regular co-commentator on rugby matches for BBC Radio Northamptonshire. His style is one of exuberance, excitement and experience.

In 2013 Diggin signed a two year deal with Northampton Saints, taking up a position as a player coach

In 2017 Diggin returned to his boyhood club of Northampton BBOB as a player-coach. He currently plays at flyhalf for the club.

References

External links
Northampton profile
England profile

1985 births
Living people
English rugby union players
Northampton Saints players
Rugby union players from Northampton
Rugby union wings